Come Follow Me may refer to:

Come Follow Me (film), short film with Bruce Marchiano 2013
"Come, follow me", by Thomas Ravenscroft (c.1582–c.1635) 
Come Follow Me, album by David L. Cook 
"Come Follow Me", song by The Mormon Tabernacle Choir
"Come Follow Me", song by The Answer from Rise (The Answer album)
"Come Follow Me", song by Aaron Carter from Oh Aaron
"Come Follow Me", song by Apache Indian from No Reservations (Apache Indian album)
"Come Follow Me", song by Untold (musician)